Donald Eugene Leppert (November 20, 1930 – January 5, 2021) was an American professional baseball second baseman.

Leppert attended Christian Brothers High School in Memphis and signed his first pro contract with the New York Yankees. He played in the Yankee farm system for five seasons. After 1954, a season during which Leppert batted .313 with ten home runs and 170 hits for the Double-A Birmingham Barons of the Southern Association, Leppert was shipped to the Baltimore Orioles in a 17-player trade, one of the largest deals in Major League Baseball history. (The swap featured Bob Turley, Don Larsen and Gus Triandos, who would go on to stardom in the Majors.) He then appeared in 40 games for the 1955 Orioles, mustering only eight hits in 70 at bats for a .114 career MLB batting average. He had one extra-base hit, a triple, during that time.

Leppert finished his playing career in minor league baseball with Birmingham in 1956. He hit .291 in 789 minor-league games.

He is sometimes confused with Donald George Leppert, a catcher who played for the Pittsburgh Pirates and Washington Senators during the 1960s, and later a longtime coach for several MLB teams.

Leppert died on January 5, 2021, at the age of 90.

References

External links
 

1930 births
2021 deaths
Baltimore Orioles players
Baseball players from Memphis, Tennessee
Birmingham Barons players
Charleston Senators players
Kansas City Blues (baseball) players
Major League Baseball second basemen
McAlester Rockets players
Norfolk Tars players
Quincy Gems players
Vancouver Mounties players